The Boxing competition at the 2014 Pan American Sports Festival was held at Gimnasio Olímpico Juan de la Barrera, Mexico City, Mexico from 16–20 July.

Medal summary

Men's events

Women's events

References

External links
Official Website

Pan American Sports Festival
Boxing